Warrenton is a town in Fauquier County, Virginia, of which it is the seat of government. The population was 9,611 at the 2010 census, up from 6,670 at the 2000 census. The estimated population in 2019 was 10,027. It is at the junction of U.S. Route 15, U.S. Route 17, U.S. Route 29, and U.S. Route 211. The town is in the Piedmont region of Virginia just east of the Blue Ridge Mountains. Fauquier Hospital is located in the town. Surrounded by Virginia wine and horse country, Warrenton is a popular destination outside Washington, D.C.

Warrenton shares some services with the county, such as schools and the county landfill. The area was home to Bethel Military Academy.

History
The settlement which would grow into the town of Warrenton began as a crossroads at the junction of the Falmouth-Winchester and Alexandria-Culpeper roads, where a trading post called the Red Store was located. In the 1790s, a courthouse was built in the area, and the location was known as "Fauquier Courthouse".

The Town of Warrenton was incorporated on January 5, 1810, and named for General Joseph Warren, a Revolutionary War hero. Richard Henry Lee donated the land for the county seat. John S. Horner, Secretary of Wisconsin Territory and Acting Governor of Michigan Territory, was born in Warrenton.

Confederate Colonel John S. Mosby made raids in the town during the American Civil War and later made his home and practiced law in Warrenton. The Warren Green Hotel building hosted many famous people, including the Marquis de Lafayette, James Monroe, Andrew Jackson, Henry Clay, President Theodore Roosevelt, and divorcée Wallis Simpson. Union General George B. McClellan bade farewell to his officers November 11, 1862, from the steps of the hotel. It now hosts some offices of the Fauquier County government.

Arthur Jordan, an African-American man, was lynched by a mob of approximately 60–75 men in white hoods in the early hours of January 19, 1880. Jordan had been accused of miscegenation and bigamy for eloping with Elvira (Lucille) Corder, the daughter of his white employer, Nathan Corder, a landowner and farmer in the upper part of the county along the Rappahannock River. A group of local men hunted the pair down near Williamsport, Maryland, captured Mr. Jordan and returned him to Fauquier, whereupon he was delivered to the town jail. Later that night, the masked lynch mob gained access to the jail and dragged Jordan to the nearby town cemetery, where he was hanged from a small locust tree. Ms. Corder remained in Maryland, estranged from her family, until her death a few years later. News of the lynching was reported in papers across the nation. Even some foreign newspapers, such as Australia's Sydney Morning Herald, reprinted accounts of the event.

In 1909, a fire destroyed almost half the structures in the town, and was halted with the use of dynamite to create a firebreak to stop the flames from spreading.

In 1951, the federal government established the Warrenton Training Center just outside Warrenton. The center is a secret Central Intelligence Agency communications facility, which also houses an underground relocation bunker containing communications infrastructure to support continuity of government in the event of a nuclear attack on Washington, DC.

A bypass route around the town was built in the early 1960s, which attracted restaurants, gas stations, and shopping centers, but also drew businesses away from the center of town.

The Warrenton Historic District was listed on the National Register of Historic Places in 1983. Other listings in or near Warrenton include Brentmoor, Dakota, Hopefield, Loretta, Monterosa, North Wales, The Oaks, the Old Fauquier County Jail, and Yorkshire House.

Geography 
Warrenton is located in central Fauquier County at  (38.718307, −77.797085). U.S. Route 15 follows US 29 out of town in both directions, but leads north-northeast  to Leesburg. U.S. Route 17 leads northwest  to Winchester and southeast  to Fredericksburg, and U.S. Route 211 leads west  to Skyline Drive in Shenandoah National Park.

The eastern, southern, and northern parts of the town drain east to Cedar Run, a tributary of the Occoquan River and part of the Potomac River watershed, while the western part of town drains south via Great Run to the Rappahannock River.

Education
Fauquier County Public Schools serves Warrenton. Public schools in the town include Fauquier High School, Warrenton Middle School, and Taylor Middle School. The elementary schools consist of J.G. Brumfield, C.M. Bradley, and P. B. Smith. There are three private schools in the town of Warrenton: Highland School, St. John The Evangelist's Catholic School, and St. James' Episcopal School.

Transportation

Warrenton is served by four U.S. Routes; U.S. Route 15, U.S. Route 17, U.S. Route 29 (which collectively form the Eastern Bypass) and U.S. Route 211. US 15 extends north and south, heading towards Leesburg in the north and Orange to the south. US 17 is oriented northwest to southeast, connecting to Winchester to the northwest and Fredericksburg to the southeast. US 29 is oriented northeast to southwest, reaching Washington, D.C. to the northeast and Charlottesville to the southwest. Finally, US 211 begins north of the downtown area and extends westward, passing through Luray and the Shenandoah Valley. All four highways originally passed directly through the center of town and now follow bypasses. However, downtown Warrenton is now served by U.S Route 15 Business, U.S Route 17 Business, U.S Route 29 Business and U.S Route 211 Business.

Virginia Regional Transit operates the Circuit Rider bus in Warrenton. Academy Bus operates a commuter bus from Warrenton to Washington, D.C.

Notable people

James DeRuyter Blackwell, Civil War-era poet and writer
Steve Brodie, Major League Baseball player
Edward Brooke, U.S. senator
Anthony Cave Brown, Journalist and historian
Jesse Brown, former U.S. Secretary of Veterans Affairs
Samuel Chilton, 19th-century politician and lawyer
Walter Chrysler, founder of the Chrysler Corporation
Walter P. Chrysler Jr., art collector, museum benefactor, and Thoroughbred horse breeder 
Julia Ringwood Coston, 19th-century Afro-American publisher and magazine editor who founded the first magazine ever published for black women
Mike Duvall, Major League Baseball player
George B. Fitch, former mayor of Warrenton and co-founder of the Jamaican bobsled team
Ella Fitzgerald, drag queen
Benita Fitzgerald-Brown, Olympic athlete
Craig Gilmore, winner, 2013 ESPN Tournament Challenge
John S. Horner, acting governor of Michigan Territory
Eppa Hunton, U.S. congressman and senator, brigadier general in the Confederate Army
John C. Mackie, U.S. congressman
Malcolm MacPherson, Newsweek correspondent and author
Frances Harrison Marr (1835–1918), poet
Charles Marshall, Confederate States Army colonel
James K. Marshall, Confederate States Army colonel
John Augustine Marshall, U.S. federal judge
Thomas Love Moore, U.S. congressman and lawyer
William Moore, blues musician
John S. Mosby, Confederate cavalry battalion commander
William H. F. Payne, Confederate States Army general
Ric Savage, pro wrestler, television star, archaeologist
Scott Shipp, superintendent of the Virginia Military Institute
William "Extra Billy" Smith, congressman, twice governor of Virginia, and Confederate general
Gwyn R. Tompkins, Thoroughbred horse racing trainer
Septimus Tustin, clergyman
Erica Wallach, American-German political activist and teacher
Sarah White, singer-songwriter
Charles S. Whitehouse, career Foreign Service officer, U.S. Ambassador to Laos and Thailand
Bonnie Zacherle, illustrator and designer

Climate
The climate in this area is characterized by hot, humid summers and generally mild to cool winters. According to the Köppen Climate Classification system, Warrenton has a humid subtropical climate, abbreviated "Cfa" on climate maps.

Demographics 

As of the census of 2000, there were 6,670 people, 2,683 households, and 1,591 families residing in the town.  The population density was 1,574.8 people per square mile (607.4/km2).  There were 2,856 housing units at an average density of 674.3 per square mile (260.1/km2).  The racial makeup of the town was 80.04% White, 16.49% African American, 0.24% Native American, 1.00% Asian, 0.01% Pacific Islander, 0.63% from other races, and 1.57% from two or more races. Hispanic or Latino of any race were 3.25% of the population.

There were 2,683 households, out of which 28.7% had children under the age of 18 living with them, 41.6% were married couples living together, 14.5% had a female householder with no husband present, and 40.7% were non-families.  33.7% of all households were made up of individuals, and 13.2% had someone living alone who was 65 years of age or older.  The average household size was 2.33 and the average family size was 3.01.

In the town, the population was spread out, with 23.9% under the age of 18, 6.7% from 18 to 24, 31.0% from 25 to 44, 21.0% from 45 to 64, and 17.5% who were 65 years of age or older. The median age was 38 years. For every 100 females, there were 84.8 males. For every 100 females age 18 and over, there were 77.8 males.

The median income for a household in the town was $50,760, and the median income for a family was $59,744. Males had a median income of $40,405 versus $31,689 for females. The per capita income for the town was $23,552. About 6.7% of families and 9.3% of the population were below the poverty line, including 9.3% of those under age 18 and 10.2% of those age 65 or over.

References

External links

 Town of Warrenton official website
 Fauquier County Public Library
 Warrenton Volunteer Fire Company
 Historic Warrenton Presbyterian Church 
 Warrenton Historic District - National Register of Historic Places, Final Nomination Form
 Warrenton Historic District Design Guidelines 
 Greater Warrenton Chamber of Commerce 

Towns in Virginia
Towns in Fauquier County, Virginia
County seats in Virginia